Giuseppe Schiavon (born 20 June 1941) is an Italian rower. He competed in the men's eight event at the 1964 Summer Olympics.

References

1941 births
Living people
Italian male rowers
Olympic rowers of Italy
Rowers at the 1964 Summer Olympics
Sportspeople from the Metropolitan City of Venice
People from Murano